Love Affairs is a 1927 German silent film directed by Jaap Speyer and starring Anita Dorris, Anton Pointner, and Albert Steinrück.

The film's sets were designed by the art director Alfred Junge.

Cast

References

Bibliography

External links

1927 films
Films of the Weimar Republic
Films directed by Jaap Speyer
German silent feature films
German black-and-white films
Terra Film films